The Midnight Riders is the independent supporters group for the New England Revolution of Major League Soccer. The name refers to the Midnight Ride of Paul Revere at the beginning of the American Revolutionary War. The main aim of the Midnight Riders “is to form a network of supporters such that (they) can meet, watch, travel to, and discuss games, and have a collective voice for supporters' interests with Revolution management.” The Midnight Riders are viewed as “the most passionate Revolution followers”, have been around since the inception of the league, and are known for their use of chants, singing, drums, and banners to show their support for the team and lead others in doing so. The main colors worn amongst The Midnight Riders are dark blue and white (often jerseys of New England Revolution players). The majority of the Midnight Riders sit in the north stand of the stadium (section 143) and have a banner hanging across the front of this section. In addition to their game time activities The Midnight Riders are responsible for hosting and participating in charitable events, organizing road trips to away games, and awarding an annual “Man of the Year” award.

The Fort
The majority of the Midnight Riders occupy Section 143 of Gillette Stadium, the section behind the goal at the north end of the stadium, which they have nicknamed "The Fort". The Fort is a general admission section and draws its name from the revolutionary theme which runs through the team and independent supporters' associations.

The Fort is open to all supporters of the New England Revolution who want to support their team by singing, chanting, shouting, standing, waving flags, and doing so in the company of other like-minded fans, as long as they agree with on Midnight Riders first motto . The other Revolution supporters groups the Rev Army and The Rebellion also stand in The Fort.

Midnight Riders Man of the Year
The Midnight Riders annually present an award to the New England player deemed most valuable to the team. The award is voted on by the membership. At the conclusion of every game, members are able to vote online for that game's Man of the Match. At the final home game of the regular season, those votes are tallied and the award is presented by the board of the organization to the winning player. Taylor Twellman is the winningest player, having been presented the award four times between 2002 and 2007.

References

External links

Major League Soccer fan clubs
New England Revolution
Ultras groups
1995 establishments in Massachusetts